In mechanics, a couple is a system of forces with a resultant (a.k.a. net or sum) moment of force but no resultant force.

A better term is force couple or pure moment. Its effect is to impart angular momentum but no linear momentum. In rigid body dynamics, force couples are free vectors, meaning their effects on a body are independent of the point of application.

The resultant moment of a couple is a special case of moment. A couple has the property that it is independent of reference point.

Simple couple
Definition

A couple is a pair of forces, equal in magnitude, oppositely directed, and displaced by perpendicular distance or moment.

The simplest kind of couple consists of two equal and opposite forces whose lines of action do not coincide. This is called a "simple couple". The forces have a turning effect or moment called a torque about an axis which is normal (perpendicular) to the plane of the forces. The SI unit for the torque of the couple is newton metre.

where
 is the moment of couple 
 is the magnitude of the force
 is the perpendicular distance (moment) between the two parallel forces

Independence of reference point

The moment of a force is only defined with respect to a certain point  (it is said to be the "moment about ") and, in general, when  is changed, the moment changes. However, the moment (torque) of a couple is independent of the reference point : Any point will give the same moment. In other words, a couple, unlike any more general moments, is a "free vector". (This fact is called Varignon's Second Moment Theorem.)

The new moment is

Now the distributive property of the cross product implies

However, the definition of a force couple means that

Therefore,

This proves that the moment is independent of reference point, which is proof that a couple is a free vector.

Forces and couples
 
A force F applied to a rigid body at a distance d from the center of mass has the same effect as the same force applied directly to the center of mass and a couple Cℓ = Fd. The couple produces an angular acceleration of the rigid body at right angles to the plane of the couple. The force at the center of mass accelerates the body in the direction of the force without change in orientation. The general theorems are:
A single force acting at any point O′ of a rigid body can be replaced by an equal and parallel force F acting at any given point O and a couple with forces parallel to F whose moment is M = Fd, d being the separation of O and O′. Conversely, a couple and a force in the plane of the couple can be replaced by a single force, appropriately located.

Any couple can be replaced by another in the same plane of the same direction and moment, having any desired force or any desired arm.

Applications

Couples are very important in mechanical engineering and the physical sciences. A few examples are: 
 The forces exerted by one's hand on a screw-driver
 The forces exerted by the tip of a screwdriver on the head of a screw
 Drag forces acting on a spinning propeller
 Forces on an electric dipole in a uniform electric field.
 The reaction control system on a spacecraft.
 Force exerted by hands on steering wheel.

See also
 Traction (engineering)
 Torque
 Moment (physics)
 Force

References

 H.F. Girvin (1938) Applied Mechanics, §28 Couples, pp 33,4, Scranton Pennsylvania: International Textbook Company.

Physical quantities
Mechanics